Widemouth Creek is a stream in the U.S. state of West Virginia.

Widemouth Creek was named for the fact the creek has a relatively wide mouth.

See also
List of rivers of West Virginia

References

Rivers of Mercer County, West Virginia
Rivers of West Virginia